The Henley Sharks Football Club is an Australian sports club headquartered in Henley Beach, South Australia. Established in 1899, Henley's main sports are Australian rules football and netball. The football team currently plays in the Adelaide Footy League. The Henley 'Sharks' field 5 senior men's teams in the league, Division 2, Division 2 Reserves, C & D Grade plus an Under 18's. The sharks in recent years have also established women's teams along with the many many junior teams in the SANFL in grades ranging from Under 8's through to Under 16's boys & girls.

The Henley FC has been affiliated with several different leagues over their history including the SAAFL, West Torrens District Football Association, Adelaide & Suburban Football League and the South Australian Football Association (SAFA). The Henley Sharks have also been known as Grange, Henley Beach, Henley & Grange, Henley Two Blues, Henley Eagles, Henley District & Old Scholars and Henley Greek.

History 
The "Henley Football Club" was formed in 1899 and played its 1st season in a competition known as the "Port Adelaide Football Association". Before 1920 the club played at an oval of the Henley area.

In 1906 Henley affiliated to "Suburban United Football Association" and one year later it won the premiership at the Unley Oval against St. Bartholomew, being the first official championship won by the club.

Troops returning from World War I established the "Grange Football Club", playing in several competitions of South Australia. Before the 1920 season Grange FC merged with Henley to join forces and improve the level for the competition. The club was renamed "Henley & Grange Football Club" and played its home games at Grange Oval, which would be the venue for the next 27 years.

The team played the Grand Final that season but it was defeated by University. In 1934, Henley & Grange won its first Premiership in the Division 2.

Australian Football League (AFL) players who represented Henley as juniors include Warren Tredrea (Port Adelaide), Sam Phillipou (Western Bulldogs), Matthew Pavlich (Fremantle), Ken McGregor (Adelaide), Paul Bulluss (Richmond) and Brodie Smith (Adelaide).

A-Grade Premierships 
 South Australian Amateur Football League (SAAFL)
 Division 1 (1): 2010 
 Division 2 (1): 2004 (Undefeated)

Merger history 
Henley Football Club was formed in 1994 as the Henley Greek Football Club, a merger of the Henley Districts and Old Scholars Football Club and the Greek Football Club, who had broken away from an existing merger with the Camden Football Club.

Henley District and Old Scholars 
The Henley District and Old Scholars Football Club was formed in 1978 from a merger of the Henley Football Club and the Henley High Old Scholars Football Club.  Initially participating in the South Australian Amateur Football League (SAAFL), Henley District and Old Scholars shifted to the South Australian Football Association (SAFA) in 1982, where it remained until it merged with the remnants of the Greek Football Club to form the Henley Greek Football Club and returning to the SAAFL.

A-Grade Premierships
 South Australian Football Association A1 (2)
 1992 
 1993
 South Australian Football Association A2 (1)
 1983

Henley High Old Scholars 
The Henley High Old Scholars Football Club was formed in 1974 and entered the South Australian Amateur Football League (SAAFL).  The club lasted for four seasons before merging with Henley to form the Henley District and Old Scholars Football Club in 1978.

A-Grade Premierships
 South Australian Amateur Football League A5 (1)
 1974

Greek 
The Greek Football Club was established as the Greek Orthodox Football Club participating in the United Church Football Association before it shifted to the South Australian Amateur Football League (SAAFL) in 1969.  In 1970 the club was renamed the Greek Football Club and continued in the SAAFL until it entered a merger in 1987 with the Camden Football Club to form the Greek Camden Football Club.  This partnership would last until 1994 when the partnership split with the Camden part merging with Plympton High Old Scholars to form the PHOS Camden Football Club, and the Greek component merging with Henley District and Old Scholars to form the Henley Greek Football Club.

A-Grade Premierships
 South Australian Amateur Football League A1 (1)
 1985
 South Australian Amateur Football League A2 (1)
 1982

Henley (1958–1977) 
Henley Football Club was formed in 1958 as the Henley and Grange Football Club, a merger of the Henley Football Club and the Grange Football Club.  In 1970 the club was renamed the Henley Football Club.

A-Grade Premierships
 South Australian Amateur Football League A2 (2)
 1965
 1973

Henley (1947–1958) 
Henley Football Club was formed as the Henley Beach Football Club, known as the "Two Blues" in 1947 and entered the West Torrens District Football Association.  In 1953 Henley shifted to the South Australian Amateur Football League (SAAFL) where it remained until it merged with the Grange Football Club in 1958 to form the Henley and Grange Football Club.

A-Grade Premierships
 West Torrens District Football Association Blue Division (3)
 1950
 1951 Undefeated
 1952 Undefeated
 South Australian Amateur Football League A2 (1)
 1954
 South Australian Amateur Football League A3 (1)
 1953 Undefeated

Grange (1920–1958) 
Grange Football Club was formed as the Henley and Grange Football Club in 1920 as a merger of the Henley Beach Football Club and the Grange Football Club, initially participating in the South Australian Amateur Football League (SAAFL).  In 1923 the club went into recess before reviving and joining the West Torrens Football Association.  Henley and Grange returned to the SAAFL in 1927, and in 1937 was renamed the Grange Football Club and shifted to the Adelaide and Suburban Football Association.  In 1947, Grange joined the reformed West Torrens District Football Association, returning to the SAAFL in 1955.  In 1958 Grange merged with Henley and revived the Henley and Grange name.

A-Grade Premierships
 South Australian Amateur Football League A2 (1)
 1934
 West Torrens District Football Association Gold Division
 1948

Henley Beach (-1920) 
The Henley Beach Football Club merged with the Grange Football Club in 1920 to form the Henley and Grange Football Club.

A-Grade Premierships
 Suburban United Football Association (1)
 1907
 Adelaide Junior Football Association (1)
 1913

Grange (-1920) 
The Grange Football Club merged with the Henley Beach Football Club in 1920 to form the Henley & Grange Football Club.

References

External links
 

Australian rules football clubs in South Australia
Adelaide Footy League clubs
Australian rules football clubs established in 1994
1994 establishments in Australia